Sijthoff may refer to:

People
Albertus Willem Sijthoff (1829–1913), a prominent Dutch publisher
Albert Georg Sijthoff (1853–1927), son of Albertus Willem Sijthoff and publisher of the Haagsche Courant
Bob Sijthoff, descendant of Albertus Willem Sijthoff who sued Wikimedia in the Netherlands in 2008

Other
3201 Sijthoff, an asteroid named after Albert Georg Sijthoff
Luitingh-Sijthoff, a Dutch publishing company passed down through the Sijthoff family
Sijthoff Planetarium, a planetarium in the Hague that burned down in 1975